Ginger Ann Conejero (born July 16, 1984)  is a Filipina beauty queen and TV reporter and host for ABS-CBN. She works for NBC San Francisco affiliate, KNTV since 2021.

Biography
She joined Miss Philippines Earth 2006 and was crowned Miss Philippines Air (1st Runner-Up). After her reign as Miss Philippines Air, she joined ABS-CBN as an entertainment reporter for TV Patrol and Mornings @ ANC.

She joined the morning show Umagang Kay Ganda in 2009, together with Atom Araullo. Her hosting stint with the show ended in 2011.

Awards and nominations

Notes

References

External links and references
   - from PEP.ph
  - from ABS-CBN News website
  - from The Manila Bulletin

1984 births
Canadian expatriates in the Philippines
Filipino television presenters
Living people
Miss Philippines Earth winners
ABS-CBN personalities
ABS-CBN News and Current Affairs people
Filipino television journalists
Filipino women journalists
Star Magic
Women television journalists
Filipino women television presenters